Adrian Rolko (born 14 September 1978) is a Czech defender who plays for FC Hradec Králové in the Czech Gambrinus Liga. At , he is one of the tallest players in the Czech league.

He made his move to FK Mlada Boleslav from FC Hradec Králové, the club he had been with since youth. He also has a loan spell at HFK Olomouc in 2002 and a short stay at French division 4 side GAP HAFC in 2004 behind him.

References
 Profile at iDNES.cz
 Guardian Football

Sportspeople from Hradec Králové
Czech First League players
FC Hradec Králové players
FK Mladá Boleslav players
Czech footballers
1978 births
Living people
Association football defenders
1. HFK Olomouc players